General Reyes may refer to:

Angelo Reyes (1945–2011), Armed Forces of the Philippines general
Bernardo Reyes (1850–1913), Mexican general
José J. Reyes (born 1963), Puerto Rico National Guard major general
Rafael Fernández Reyes (born 1897), Chilean Army general
Rafael Reyes (1849–1921), Colombian National Army general

See also
Juan José Reyes-Patria Escobar (1785–1872), Colombian Independence War general